The C Stock was built for the District Railway in 1910. The additional rolling stock was required to increase the frequency of the service (particularly given the introduction of automatic electro-pneumatic signalling which allowed less headway between trains), plus the four-tracking of the section west of Hammersmith which allowed a greater frequency of trains to and from Richmond.

History
Fifty-two cars were built by Hurst Nelson, thirty-two were driving motor cars and the remaining twenty were trailer cars. The design was based on the earlier B Stock and was the basis for the D Stock trains which appeared in 1912.

In 1928 the 20 trailer cars were rebuilt into motor cars. In the 1940s the C, D and E stocks were reclassified as "H Stock" (signifying hand-operated doors), along with other pre-1938 District Line rolling stock that had not been converted to have air-operated doors. The H Stock was largely eliminated by the early 1950s, following replacement by R Stock. The remaining cars were largely confined to the Olympia shuttle service and were withdrawn from passenger service by the late 1950s. A few examples continued in use for a time, painted grey, as "Stores Carriers", before being finally broken up in May 1963.

The C Stock remains the only fleet of London Underground carriages to have been built in Scotland. No vehicles have survived into preservation. In appearance, they were similar to the B Stock.

References

 J. Graeme Bruce, Steam to Silver, published by the London Transport Executive, 1970, pages 89–94

Metropolitan District Railway
C
Train-related introductions in 1910